Mecranium revolutum is a rare tree from Haiti, specifically in Sud. It is endemic to the Morne Formon-Pic Macaya region of the Massif de la Hotte mountain range. Along with the other species of Mecranium from the area it is called "macrio", or "bwa pijon" in Haitian Creole.

Mecranium revolutum was first described in 1986 after being collected in the Parc National Pic Macaya in the Massif de la Hotte mountains.

Key features 
It has gray smooth bark and 4-angled (square) young stems. The thick, waxy leaves are opposite and simple, and are clustered at the stem tips. It flowers in May and June, on determinate (cymose) inflorescences that are produced on the bare stems below the clusters of leaves. The 4-merous flowers are small and white with prominent stamens. The berries that follow are initially green, ripening to reddish, and contain numerous seeds.

Ecology 
The habitat of M. revolutum is moist hardwood forest located on rugged mountainous terrain including deep, narrow gorges with steep sides, domes or slopes. Limestone is evident in this area.

Phylogeny 
Mecranium revolutum may be most closely related to M. torbecianum which is another poorly researched La Hotte endemic which has similar phenotypic traits. The species differ in flower characteristics, however.

References 

Melastomataceae
Endemic flora of Haiti